St John's GAA is a Gaelic Athletic Association club representing the areas of Aubane, Kilcorney and Mushera in the north west of County Cork, Ireland. The club plays Gaelic football only. Founded in 2010, the club competes in the Duhallow Junior B Football Championship.

History
The club was founded in 2010 and adopted the St John's name after the nearby holy well on the foot of Musheramore.

Honours
 Duhallow Junior B Football Championship
  Winners (3): 2017 2018, 2019
  Runners-Up (1): 2016
 Cork Junior C Football Championship
  Winners (1): 2019
  Runners-Up (1): 2017
 Cork Junior B Football League 
  Winners (1): 2018

References